Eliyahu Offer (1 June 1944 – 15 December 2022) was an Israeli football professional player and manager. He played as a defensive midfielder for Hapoel Be'er Sheva and managed the club in multiple stints.

Personal life
Offer owned a successful restaurant in Be'er Sheva.

Honours
 Premier League: 1974–75, 1975–76
 Super Cup: 1974–75; runner-up 1975–76
 Second League: 1970–71
 Super Cup Second League: 1970–71

References

1944 births
2022 deaths
Israeli Jews
Israeli footballers
Footballers from Beersheba
Hapoel Be'er Sheva F.C. players
Liga Leumit players
Israeli football managers
Hapoel Be'er Sheva F.C. managers
Beitar Jerusalem F.C. managers
Hapoel Tel Aviv F.C. managers
Hapoel Jerusalem F.C. managers
Maccabi Sha'arayim F.C. managers
Maccabi Yavne F.C. managers
Association football midfielders